"No Hace Falta" (English: There's No Need) is a ballad written and produced by Emilio Estefan, Jr., co-wrriten by Nicolás Tovar and Randall M. Barlow and performed by Mexican singer-songwriter Cristian Castro. The song was released as the lead single from eighth studio album Amar Es (2003). It was released by BMG U.S. Latin on June 30, 2003 (see 2003 in music).

Chart performance

Weekly charts

Year-end charts

Music video
A music video, directed by Emilio Estefan, Jr. was shot in 2003. Set in a washitsu, Cristian's then wife Gabriela Bo appeared in the video as a Geisha. The video was included in the album Amar Es and was also included in Nunca Voy a Olvidarte...Los Exitos DVD.

References

2003 singles
2003 songs
Cristian Castro songs
Spanish-language songs
Songs written by Emilio Estefan
RCA Records singles
2000s ballads
Latin ballads
Pop ballads
Song recordings produced by Emilio Estefan